La Pera is a municipality in Catalonia, north-eastern Spain. It includes the village of Púbol. The castle of Púbol includes a Gothic church with an altarpiece by Bernat Martorell; 20th-century painter Salvador Dalí resided here with his wife.

References

External links
 Government data pages 

Municipalities in Baix Empordà
Populated places in Baix Empordà